Michael Andrew Macfarlane (born April 12, 1964) is an American former professional baseball player. He played as a catcher in Major League Baseball for the Kansas City Royals (1987–1994, 1996–1998), Boston Red Sox (1995), and Oakland Athletics (1998–1999).

Early life
Macfarlane graduated from Lincoln High School in Stockton, California in 1982. He played collegiate baseball for Santa Clara University before his selection in the fourth round (97th overall) of the 1985 draft.

Career
In 1988, Macfarlane became the first Royals rookie catcher to start on Opening Day since Ellie Rodríguez in 1969. In 1992, he led Kansas City with 17 home runs and a .445 slugging percentage. In 1994, he became the Royals leader in all-time games caught, surpassing a club record set by John Wathan.

In a 13-season major league career, Macfarlane posted a .252 batting average with 129 home runs and 514 runs batted in in 1,164 games played. He is ranked 64th all-time among American League catchers with a .992 fielding percentage while throwing out 33% of potential basestealers. His 97 hit by pitches ranks him 100th on the MLB all-time list.

External links

Mike Macfarlane - Baseballbiography.com
Encyclopedia of Baseball Catchers

Major League Baseball catchers
Baseball players from Stockton, California
Kansas City Royals players
Oakland Athletics players
Boston Red Sox players
1964 births
Living people
Memphis Chicks players
Omaha Royals players
Santa Clara Broncos baseball players
Anchorage Bucs players